Slains Castle (otherwise known as Old Slains Castle) is a ruined castle near Collieston in Aberdeenshire, Scotland. It is not to be confused with New Slains Castle, a separate building located five miles to the north-east. Built in the13th century, it was partly destroyed in 1594.

History 
The 13th-century castle was originally the property of the Comyn, Earl of Buchan.  After the forfeiture of the Comyns in the 14th century it was given to Sir Gilbert Hay by Robert the Bruce in recognition for his support against the English.

Slains Castle next comes into prominence when Francis Hay, 9th Earl of Erroll took part in a Catholic Rebellion in the north of Scotland. It was said in January 1593 that Francis Hay, 9th Earl of Erroll welcomed so many English and Scottish Catholics in a tower at Slaines that he was put to great expense. The rebellion culminated in the Battle of Glenlivet in 1594, which left the Catholic army substantially weakened, and the rebellion collapsed.   

King James VI marched north with an army intent on capturing the leaders of the rebellion, including Francis Hay, however they evaded capture. He then proceeded to blow up their castles, including Old Slains Castle. At the king's request, Aberdeen Council provided twenty stone weight of gunpowder together with pickaxes and other tools, required for ‘demolishing and casting down of houses and fortalices to the sum of 548 pounds six shillings’.  The castle was destroyed with gunpowder and cannon on 1 November. Aberdeen town council sent the stonemason John Fraser and other workmen to the demolition work at Huntly Castle and Slains, equipped with new shovels. Two walls meeting at a corner survived the explosion.  
  

Next year, Elizabeth Douglas, Countess of Erroll, a friend of Anne of Denmark, hired masons to repair the building. However, it was beyond saving. She then moved into the farmhouse of Clochtow, half a mile to the north-west of the ruined castle. She remained in this ‘mean abode, and continued there sometime after 1597, when the honours and estates were restored... The Countess, all her remaining days, preferred to her noble title of Countess of Erroll the plain designation of “Guidwife of Clochtow”, because this designation had never been taken by the crown from her, and she had been known by it during the period of her husband’s exile, when he was a wanderer abroad, and only plain “Francis Hay”.’  

Francis Hay later built a tower house called Bowness on what is now the site of New Slains Castle.

Structure 
Originally a strongly built 5-storey oblong keep (of which a small part remains), a wall defending the landward side was added in the early 16th century.

Modern day 
The south-facing wall partially collapsed on 31 May 1979. An estimated 100 tons of rubble fell on the road next to the castle, blocking the road and partially burying a lorry. 

In the 1950s, a 3-storey house was built within the ruins, adjoining a fishing cottage built in the 18th century. Since 1991 several archaeological excavations have been carried out, the last one in 2007. The remains of the old castle are designated as a scheduled ancient monument.

References

Further reading 

 Aitken, Margaret. Six Buchan Villages Re-visited (2014)
 Moncreiffe, Iain. Slains and the Errolls (1973)
 Shepherd, Mike.  When Brave Men Shudder: The Scottish origins of Dracula (2018)
 Shepherd, Mike and Stoker, Dacre. Slains Castle’s Secret History (2021) 

Clan Hay
Ruined castles in Aberdeenshire
Scheduled Ancient Monuments in Aberdeenshire